Dieue-sur-Meuse (literally Dieue on Meuse) is a commune in the Meuse department in Grand Est in north-eastern France.

See also
 Communes of the Meuse department
 Parc naturel régional de Lorraine

References

Dieuesurmeuse